Paradoxurinae is a subfamily of the feliform viverrids that was denominated and first described by John Edward Gray in 1864. Pocock subordinated the genera Paradoxurus, Paguma and Arctictis to this subfamily.

Classification

Living species

Phylogenetic tree
The phylogenetic relationships of Paradoxurinae are shown in the following cladogram:

Extinct genera 
Kichechia 
Tugenictis 
Kanuites 
Siamictis

References

Viverrids
Taxa named by John Edward Gray